Andreas Antonatos (born 30 November 1938) is a retired Greek football midfielder and later manager.

References

1938 births
Living people
Greek footballers
Super League Greece players
Panachaiki F.C. players
Ethnikos Piraeus F.C. players
Greece international footballers
Greek football managers
Ethnikos Piraeus F.C. managers
Footballers from Patras
Association football midfielders